Charles Louis may refer to:

Nobility:
Charles I Louis, Elector Palatine (1617-1680)
Charles Louis Auguste Fouquet, duc de Belle-Isle (1684-1761), French general and statesman
Duke Charles Louis Frederick of Mecklenburg (1708-1752), father of Queen Charlotte of the United Kingdom
Charles Louis, Hereditary Prince of Baden (1755-1801)
Charles Louis Huguet, marquis de Sémonville (1759-1839), French diplomat and politician
Charles Louis Napoléon Bonaparte (1808 – 1873), 1st President of France, later Emperor of the French as Napoléon III.
Charles Auguste Louis Joseph, duc de Morny (1811-1865), French statesman
Archduke Charles Louis of Austria (1833-1896), father of Archduke Franz Ferdinand of Austria
Archduke Carl Ludwig of Austria (1918-2007)
Charles-Louis, duc de Chartres (born 1972)

Other people:
Charles-Louis Richard (1711-1794), Catholic theologian
Charles-Louis Clérisseau (1721-1820), French architectural draughtsman
Charles Louis L'Héritier de Brutelle (1746-1800), French botanist and magistrate
Charles-Louis de Fourcroy (born 1766), French Consul at A Coruña
Antoine Charles Louis Lasalle (1775-1809), French cavalry General during the Revolutionary and Napoleonic Wars
Charles-Louis Havas (1783-1858), French writer and founder of the news agency Agence France-Presse (AFP)
Charles-Louis Hanon (1819-1900), French piano pedagogue and composer
Charles Louis Kincannon (born 1940), former director of the United States Census Bureau
Charles-Louis Seck (born 1965), retired Senegalese athlete

See also
Charles Lewis (disambiguation)
Karl Ludwig (disambiguation)